Nobuyuki Idei (出井 伸之, Idei Nobuyuki; 22 November 1937 – 2 June 2022) was a Japanese businessman. He was chairman and group chief executive officer of Sony Corporation until 7 March 2005. He was a director of General Motors, Baidu, Yoshimoto Kogyo and Nestlé.

Early life 
Idei was born in Tokyo on 22 November 1937. His father was a professor of economics at Waseda University, a private university in Tokyo.

Career 
Idei joined Sony Corporation when he graduated from Waseda University. He started as a trainee working with the co-founders Akio Morita and Masaru Ibuka and rose through the ranks as a marketing specialist. During the time, he also moved to Europe to manage Sony's businesses in the continent.

After a stroke sidelined former chairman Akio Morita, Sony CEO and new chairman Norio Ohga selected Idei to be the next president, a choice that raised eyebrows at Sony. His sweeping reorganizations of the company included trimming the board of directors from 38 members dominated by company management to 10 with a substantial presence of outsiders. Already perceived as the company's driving force, Idei was formally named co-CEO in 1998 and sole CEO in 1999. In 2000, while Ohga remained chairman of the board, Idei became executive chairman and Kunitake Andō became president.

In 2003, on Ohga's retirement, Idei became the sole chairman, and the title of chief executive officer was altered to group chief executive officer. On 7 March 2005, it was announced that Idei would be succeeded on 22 June by Sir Howard Stringer.

In 2006, Idei joined the board leading Accenture. On 28 September 2011, Idei joined the board of directors of Lenovo.

Idei founded his own consulting firm Quantum Leaps Corporation on his retirement from Sony. He was also on the board of companies including General Motors and Baidu.

On 5 February 2015, Idei retired from Accenture's board of directors.

Personal life 
Idei was married and had a daughter. He died on 2 June 2022 from liver failure. He was aged 84.

References

External links 
 Biography
 "ZL Technologies Appoints Former CEO of SONY to Its Advisory Board"
 Nobuyuki Idei anfiniti

1937 births
2022 deaths
Accenture people
Baidu people
Lenovo people
Sony people
Nestlé people
Businesspeople from Tokyo
Waseda University alumni
Graduate Institute of International and Development Studies alumni
Directors of Nestlé
General Motors former executives
Japanese chief executives
Japanese chairpersons of corporations
Recipients of the Legion of Honour
Deaths from liver failure